The Cadillac Evening News is a daily newspaper in Cadillac, Michigan. The newspaper started publishing in 1872 and serves Wexford, Osceola, Missaukee, and eastern Lake Counties.

References

External links 

 

Newspapers published in Michigan
Wexford County, Michigan
1872 establishments in Michigan